The Plzeň municipal election of 2006 was held as a part of Czech municipal elections, 2006. It was held on 20 and 21 October 2006. The Civic Democratic Party (ODS) won the election with 45% of the votes. Pavel Rödl then became the new Mayor when ODS formed a coalition with the Christian and Democratic Union – Czechoslovak People's Party (KDU-ČSL) and the Right Choice for Plzeň (PVP). The incumbent Mayor, Miroslav Kalous, didn't participate in the election.

Campaign
Seven parties contested the election. ODS and ČSSD were the main contesting parties. ODS was led by Pavel Rödl while ČSSD was led by Milan Chovanec.

Results

External links
 Results

References

2006
2006 elections in Europe
2006 elections in the Czech Republic